Fawkner Memorial Park is located in the north-western Melbourne suburb of Fawkner, Victoria, Australia. It is the largest cemetery by land size in the state, and managed by Greater Metropolitan Cemeteries Trust.

Merlynston Creek, a tributary of Merri Creek, is a major geographical feature running through both Fawkner Cemetery and the Northern Memorial Park.

History
In 1906, the Municipal Cemetery, Fawkner (as it was then called) opened to meet the needs of the north west. The cemetery was designed and run by Charles Heath, a surveyor and architect. The first burial took place on 10 December 1906. This was considered to be the unofficial opening of the cemetery. The funeral was conducted by John Allison from Sydney Road. The cemetery was adjacent to Fawkner railway station on the Upfield line, with special trains carrying the deceased to the cemetery from 1906 to 1939.

On 1 November 1997, Mersina Halvagis was murdered in the cemetery by Peter Dupas.

Management
Fawkner Memorial Park is operated by Greater Metropolitan Cemeteries Trust (GMCT), who manage 18 other sites across Victoria, Australia.

Interments
 Lilian Alexander (1861–1934), pioneering surgeon
 John Barrett (1858–1928), Senator
 John Batman (1801–1839), pioneer, one of the founders of Melbourne
 Kathleen Best (1910–1957), founder of the Women's Royal Australian Army Corps
 Thomas Blamey (1884–1951), Field Marshal (cremated)
 Deirdre Cash (1924–1963), novelist, wrote under the nom-de-plume "Criena Rohan"
 George Ward Cole (1793–1879), pioneer
 Revel Cooper (c.1934–1983), Nyoongar artist
 Charles Dight (1813–1852), pioneer
 Alphonse Gangitano (1957–1998), underworld identity
 James Henry Gardiner (1848–1921), North Melbourne Football Club founder and administrator
 Pinchas Goldhar (1901–1947), writer
 Henry Gregory (1860–1940), WA politician
 Edward Harrington (1895–1966), writer
 Sybil Irving (1897–1973), army officer, founder of the Australian Women's Army Service
 Donald Alaster Macdonald (1859–1932), nature writer, conservationist
 Kylie Maybury (1978–1984), murder victim
 Charlie Mutton (1890–1989), Labor politician
 Laurie Nash (1910–1986), footballer and Test cricketer
 Jack Patten (1905–1957), Koori activist, leader, writer
 Marie Pitt (1869–1948), journalist
 James Quinn (1853–1934), finder of Ireland's famous Ardagh Chalice also known as the Ardagh Hoard
 Mark "Chopper" Read (1954–2013), underworld identity and writer
 Alice Ross-King (1891–1968), nurse in both world wars, "Australia's most decorated female"
 Bernard Rubin (1896–1936), first Australian winner of 24 Hours of Le Mans and member of the Bentley Boys
 William Ruthven VC (1893–1970), soldier, politician
 Isaac Selby (1859–1956), historian
 Ernie Shepherd (1901–1958), Labor politician
 Issy Smith VC (1890–1940), soldier, born Ishroulch Shmeilowitz
 Ethel Spowers (1890–1947), artist
 Lyra Taylor (1894–1979), pioneering social worker
 Alfred Tipper (1867–1944), outsider artist, showman, cyclist
 Frank Traynor (1927–1985), jazz musician

War Graves
Fawkner Memorial Park contains the war graves of 173 Commonwealth service personnel from World War I and World War II.

In addition Fawkner Crematorium has a Commonwealth War Graves Commission memorial to 28 Australian service personnel of World War II – 23 soldiers, 4 airmen and one naval officer – who were cremated there. They included Elwyn Roy King (1894–1941) who had been a fighter ace in World War I.

References

External links 
 Fawkner Memorial Park Pioneers Section Online Map – Chronicle
 Greater Metropolitan Cemeteries Trust
 Fawkner Memorial Park – Billion Graves
 

Cemeteries in Melbourne
Crematoria in Australia
Commonwealth War Graves Commission cemeteries in Australia
Buildings and structures in the City of Merri-bek